

Season Review

Events
  – Nigel Adkins leaves Scunthorpe United to join Football League One side Southampton.
  – Ian Baraclough is appointed as manager.
  – Steve Parkin is appointed as First-Team Coach.
  – Ian Baraclough is sacked as manager and Tony Daws is appointed caretaker manager.
  – Scunthorpe United appoint Alan Knill as manager.

Football League Championship

Standings

Pld = Matches played; W = Matches won; D = Matches drawn; L = Matches lost; F = Goals for; A = Goals against; GD = Goal difference; Pts = Points; (R) = Relegated

Results summary

Result round by round

FA Cup

League Cup

Squad

Statistics

|}

Disciplinary record

Transfers

Ins

Loans In

Out

Loans Outs

Contracts

Fixtures and results

Football League Championship

FA Cup

League Cup

References 

2010–11
2010–11 Football League Championship by team